Rivercrest is a neighborhood in the northern area of Tampa, Florida, which represents District 6 of the Tampa City Council. The 2000 census numbers were unavailable, however, the latest estimated population was 616.

Geography
Rivercrest is located at 27.99334 and -82.462257. The elevation is 20 feet above sea level.

Rivercrest boundaries are roughly the Hillsborough River to the west, Hillsborough Avenue to the north, Violet Street to the south and Florida Avenue to the east. The ZIP Code serving the neighborhood is 33603.

Demographics

The latest estimated population was 616, which consists of 297 males and 319 females. The median age is 31.9 for males and 34.7 for females. The percentage of marriage couple stands at 31%.

The median income for the neighborhood is $43,049. The average family size is 2.9 and the average household size is approximately 2.3 persons.

Education
Rivercrest is served by Hillsborough County Public Schools, which serves the city of Tampa and Hillsborough County.

References

External links
Rivercrest (in Hillsborough County, FL) Populated Place Profile

Neighborhoods in Tampa, Florida